Downtown Johnstown Historic District is a national historic district located at Johnstown in Cambria County, Pennsylvania. The district includes 109 contributing buildings, 4 contributing sites, and 1 contributing structure in the central business district and surrounding residential areas of Johnstown.  The district includes some buildings dated before the Johnstown Flood, but the majority date from 1890 to 1930.  Notable buildings include the Alma Hall (1884), Bantley Building (1888), Stenger Dry Goods Store (1883), Widmann Building (1892), Cambria Iron Office Building (1881, 1885), St. Vincent DePaul Building (c. 1900), Swank Building (1907), Glosser Brothers Department Store (1905), Johnstown City Hall (1900), former U.S. Post Office (1912), State Theater (1926), U.S. Post Office (1938), Franklin Street United Methodist Church (1869), St. John Gualbert Cathedral (1896), First United Methodist Church (1911), Elks Building (1903), and Moose Building (1917). Located in the district and listed separately are the Cambria Public Library Building, G.A.R. Hall, and Nathan's Department Store.

It was listed on the National Register of Historic Places in 1992.

Gallery

References

External links
All of the following are located in Johnstown, Cambria County, PA:

Historic American Buildings Survey in Pennsylvania
Historic districts on the National Register of Historic Places in Pennsylvania
Historic districts in Cambria County, Pennsylvania
Tourist attractions in Johnstown, Pennsylvania
National Register of Historic Places in Cambria County, Pennsylvania